John Houghtaling is an American attorney and oil and gas executive. In 2014, Houghtaling’s career was featured on an episode of Inside Man with Morgan Spurlock.  He is currently the CEO of an oil and gas export company, American Ethane and is the majority owner of the law firm of Gauthier, Murphy & Houghtaling.

Legal career
Houghtaling is the majority owner of Gauthier, Murphy & Houghtaling, a New Orleans law firm. In 2005, Houghtaling served as special counsel to the Attorney General of Louisiana in the litigation of policyholder rights in the wake of Hurricane Katrina.
 
In 2014, Houghtaling was appointed plaintiffs liaison counsel by the United States Federal Court for the Eastern District. He uncovered fraud within the FEMA Flood Insurance program which led to the arrest of a key insurance contractor, a seven figure Federal fine against the insurer, and defense counsel, in the NFIP

Business
Houghtaling's business centers on property and contract rights and strategic project development in the energy sector.  From 1998-2004,he was involved in the development of the 144MW NejapaPower Plant, the first IPP power plant in El Salvador. Houghtaling later became the CEO of Ocean Therapy Solutions, an oil service company he founded with business partner, Kevin Costner.  At the same time, he co-founded Ocean Management Group, a partnership between Ocean Therapy Solutions and Edison Chouest Offshore.  Houghtaling served as government Liaison Counsel for British Petroleum in the aftermath of the Horizon oil spill disaster in negotiations between BP and the State of Louisiana. In early 2012 become the U.S. managing partner of several oil and gas holdings and investments with a multi-billion dollar investment strategy in the natural gas popularisation projects in the United States.  He holds ownership in a 200,000 acre oil and gas production play in the Pearsall of South Texas.

In 2014, he co-founded American Ethane Company. Houghtaling has signed conditionally bindings contracts to supply 7.2 Million tons a year of Ethane to China, a sale volume that exceeds 72 Billion dollars.

Personal life
In 2012, Houghtaling married Russian pop star and model Julia Timonina. They live together in New Orleans with their daughter. Together they own the historic Brown Mansion on St. Charles Avenue.

Media
Houghtaling's career was featured in a documentary on the Inside Man series hosted by Morgan Spurlock. Houghtaling has also been a legal commentator

References

1971 births
Lawyers from New Orleans
Living people
Emory University alumni
Loyola University New Orleans alumni